A. J. Riebli (born August 27, 1969) is an executive and voice actor at Pixar.

Actor 
 The Incredibles (2004) (Additional Voices)
 Cars (2006) (Additional Voices)
 Minecraft Story Mode (2015) Death Bowl Announcer

Filmography 
 Toy Story 2 (1999) (Production Office Coordinator) (Uncredited)
 Finding Nemo (2003) (Unit Manager: Schooling & Flocking)
 Ratatouille (2007) (Editorial Manager)

External links 

1969 births
Living people
American male voice actors
Pixar people